Goldie Taylor (born July 18, 1968) is an American author and opinion writer based in Atlanta, Georgia. She is an editor-at-large of The Daily Beast.

Early life
Taylor was born in University City, Missouri and raised in East St. Louis, Illinois. Her father was murdered on November 5, 1973, when she was 5, leaving her mother Mary to raise her and her siblings alone. She attended public schools in the metro St. Louis area before moving to Atlanta and graduating from Cross Keys High School in 1986. Taylor was an active duty US Marine trained in Public Affairs Broadcasting at Fort Benjamin Harrison, Indiana. She received an honorable discharge on medical grounds. Taylor then gained admission to Emory University in Atlanta where she studied Political Science and International Affairs.

Career

Political
Taylor worked on a number of political campaigns in the 1990s including the unsuccessful 1996 campaign by Guy Millner who ran as a Republican for post of United States Senator.

In later years Taylor joined Kasim Reed for mayor—where she served as Communications Director. In the intervening years, she has worked for candidates on both sides of the aisle—including fundraising for President Barack Obama's 2008 campaign. Her first campaign was Lomax for Mayor in 1993, where she worked as Deputy Press Secretary for Fulton County Commission Chair Michael Lomax.

Taylor spent four years as a political contributor to MSNBC and wrote for MSNBC.com, where she focused on social justice issues. In late September 2014, it was announced that MSNBC had not renewed her contract. She did not announce her next move at that time. She is producing her first feature-length documentary, "The Other Side of Grace," which charts the rise and decline of her hometown—East St. Louis, IL.

Writing
While a student at Emory University, Taylor began writing for the Emory Wheel as well as for The Atlanta Journal-Constitution as a part-time staff writer. She self-published her first novel, In My Father's House, with WheatMark Press in 2005. Her second novel, The January Girl, was first published by Madison Park Press in 2007 and later re-released by Grand Central Publishing, a division of Hachette. A third novel, Paper Gods, was published by St. Martin's Press in 2018.

Throughout her career she has written for The Atlanta Journal-Constitution, Creative Loafing, Marie Claire, TheGrio, CNN.com, Americablog, MSNBC.com, and EbonyJet.com. Her 2008 op-ed column regarding then Republican Vice Presidential nominee and Alaska Governor Sarah Palin, "A Woman's Worth", published by EbonyJet.com, was described in February 201 as the most visited webpage in the site's history. She is also the author of "Show Me Your Papers!", a special-contributor opinion aired on MSNBC's The Rachel Maddow Show that addressed Birtherism through the prism of a family story about her great-great-grandfather, Major Blackard.

Television
Taylor is a frequent contributor to MSNBC, CNN and HLN on social, political and faith issues. In the wake of the Penn State sex abuse scandal, Taylor revealed during a November 2011 appearance on "CNN Newsroom" with Don Lemon her own experience being sexually abused. In a post on her blog about her decision to come forward, Taylor named her abuser. Taylor also disclosed details on Twitter about the abuse which took place while she was in high school. In March 2012, Taylor appeared on The Lawrence O’Donnell Show wearing a hooded sweatshirt in solidarity with slain Florida teenager Trayvon Martin. She was the first cable news pundit to do so, being an early vocal proponent of a deeper investigation.

Corporate
Taylor has worked for the Sara Lee Corporation as director of global communications and public affairs.

Taylor has served as executive consultant to NBC News and CNN Worldwide. In 2009, while serving as a consulting producer to CNN, Taylor re-opened an investigation into the Atlanta Child Murders and convicted serial killer Wayne Williams. She was also an executive consultant to CNN's "Black in America", leading the audience tune-in strategy. "Black In America" remains one of the highest rated documentaries in CNN's history. Taylor states that she created and launched Procter & Gamble's "My Black Is Beautiful", the largest marketing effort targeting African-American women in the company's history.

She has previously been an external affairs executive for several Fortune 500 companies, as well as two of the world's largest public relations agencies, the GCI Group San Francisco and Edelman Atlanta Public Relations. Taylor is currently the CEO of Goldie Taylor Brand Communications, an Atlanta-based multi-cultural advertising and public relations agency. She is also the managing editor and host of "The Goldie Taylor Project", an opinion blog devoted to contemporary political, social, and faith issues confronting America.

Personal life
Taylor currently lives in Brooklyn, New York.

References

External links 
 The Goldie Taylor Project

1968 births
Living people
African-American journalists
American women journalists
African-American writers
Writers from Atlanta
American bloggers
Emory University alumni
African-American female military personnel
Female United States Marine Corps personnel
American women bloggers
American women non-fiction writers
21st-century American non-fiction writers
21st-century American women writers
21st-century African-American women writers
21st-century African-American writers
20th-century African-American people
20th-century African-American women
African-American United States Navy personnel